Ménétréol-sur-Sauldre (literally Ménétréol on Sauldre) is a commune in the Cher department in the Centre-Val de Loire region of France.

Geography

The Petite Sauldre flows westward through the middle of the commune; the village lies on its right bank.
The Rère flows northwestward, then southwestward, through the heavily-wooded southern part of the commune.

Population

Sights
 The church of St. Martin, dating from the nineteenth century.
 The remains of the castle of la Faye, dating from the thirteenth century.

See also
Communes of the Cher department

References

Communes of Cher (department)